The 2015 Yas Marina GP3 Series round was a GP3 Series motor race held on November 28 and 29, 2015 at Yas Marina Circuit, Abu Dhabi. It was the final showdown of the 2015 GP3 Series. The race supported the 2015 Abu Dhabi Grand Prix.

Classification

Qualifying

Feature Race

Sprint Race

See also 
 2015 Abu Dhabi Grand Prix
 2015 Yas Marina GP2 Series round

References

Yas Marina
GP3
Yas Marina